There are over 9,000 Grade I listed buildings in England. This page is a list of these buildings in the district of Selby in North Yorkshire.

Selby

|}

Notes

External links

Selby (district)
Lists of Grade I listed buildings in North Yorkshire
Selby District